Ronde may refer to:

 Rønde, a town in Denmark
 Majin Tensei: Ronde, a Japanese Sega Saturn game
 Ronde script (calligraphy)
 Ronde Barber, American sports broadcaster and former football player
 Rondé, a Dutch indie pop band

See also
Rondae Hollis-Jefferson (born 1995), American basketball player
La Ronde (disambiguation)